Vic Sotto plays Enteng Kabisote in the Filipino fantasy action comedy film franchise Enteng Kabisote based on the television sitcom Okay Ka, Fairy Ko!.

Television
Okay Ka, Fairy Ko! is a Philippine television fantasy situational comedy series broadcast by IBC, ABS-CBN and GMA Network. Directed by Bert de Leon, it stars Vic Sotto, Charito Solis and Alice Dixson. It premiered on November 26, 1987, and concluded on April 3, 1997.

Films
Since the Okay Ka, Fairy Ko! TV series, there has been seven Enteng Kabisote films and three crossover films, two with Agimat and one with Ang Tanging Ina.

Crossover films with:

	
  Agimat
  Ang Tanging Ina

Enteng Kabisote: OK Ka Fairy Ko... The Legend is the first installment of Enteng Kabisote film series and the third movie installment based on television sitcom, Okay Ka, Fairy Ko!, which made about PhP 83.6 million. It is also one of the films featured in the 2004 Metro Manila Film Festival.

Enteng Kabisote 2: Okay Ka Fairy Ko... The Legend Continues! is the second installment of the Enteng Kabisote film series and the fourth film installment based on Okay Ka, Fairy Ko!.

Enteng Kabisote 3: Okay Ka, Fairy Ko: The Legend Goes On and On and On is the third installment of the Enteng Kabisote film series, and the fifth movie installment based on TV sitcom, Okay Ka, Fairy Ko!.

Enteng Kabisote 4: Okay Ka Fairy Ko... The Beginning of the Legend is the fourth and last installment of the original Enteng Kabisote films, and the sixth installment based on the Philippine television sitcom Okay Ka, Fairy Ko!. The film is an official entry for the 2007 Metro Manila Film Festival.

In Si Agimat at Si Enteng Kabisote, Enteng (Vic Sotto) joined forces with Agimat (Bong Revilla) in order to save their respective worlds from evil. It was followed by a sequel, Si Agimat, si Enteng Kabisote at si Ako.

Enteng ng Ina Mo starred Vic Sotto and Ai-Ai delas Alas. It is a joint production by Star Cinema, M-Zet Productions, APT Entertainment and OctoArts Films and is a cross-over to the Enteng Kabisote and Tanging Ina series. It is an official entry to the 2011 Metro Manila Film Festival and was released on December 25, 2011. The movie is the last installment of Ang Tanging Ina film series and the eighth movie installment based on the sitcom, Okay Ka, Fairy Ko!.

Enteng Kabisote 10 and the Abangers is the tenth movie installment based on the television sitcom Okay Ka, Fairy Ko!. The film was submitted as an entry for the 2016 Metro Manila Film Festival but was not included as finalist. It was the first Okay Ka, Fairy Ko!/Enteng Kabisote film that did not feature in the Metro Manila Film Festival.

See also
List of Filipino superheroes

References

External links

 
Philippine fantasy comedy films